Belenois victoria, the Victoria white, is a butterfly in the family Pieridae. It is found in Kenya, Uganda, Rwanda, Burundi, Tanzania and the Democratic Republic of the Congo. The habitat consists of forests, including riparian forests.

The larvae feed on Capparis tomentosa, Ritchiea and Maerua species.

Subspecies
Belenois victoria victoria (Kenya (highlands west of the Rift Valley), Uganda)
Belenois victoria hecqi Berger, 1953 (Democratic Republic of the Congo)
Belenois victoria schoutedeni Berger, 1953 (western Uganda, Rwanda, Democratic Republic of the Congo, western Tanzania)

References

Butterflies described in 1915
Pierini